The Warsaw Eagles  are an American football team in Warsaw, Poland. They play in the Polish Football League. Paul Kusmierz is the owner of the team.

History
The team was founded in 1999 by a group of NFL enthusiasts consisting of Jędrzej Staszewski, Piotr Gorzkowski, Jan Kowalski, Grzegorz Mikuła, and Tomasz Kozankiewicz, who are considered to be the founders of the Warsaw Eagles club.

In 2004 the club purchased professional sports gear for the first time to be able to spar with the very first opponent on the Polish arena - Fireballs Wielkopolska. The first game was played on December 17 of 2004 in Suchy Las near Poznań.  In 2006 along with 1. KFA Wielkopolska, Pomorze Seahawks (currently Seahawks Gdynia) and The Crew Wrocław (currently Giants Wrocław), the Eagles debuted in the very first edition of the Polish American Football League and having dominated each game, won the first Championship title. The Eagles would go on to win the title again in 2008 defeating The Crew Wrocław 26:14.
In 2009 the team signed contracts with its first two import professional players from the United States.  
In the 2012/2013 season the Eagles signed four American import players.

Uniforms 
The Warsaw Eagles’ navy blue home jersey has orange numbers, letter outlines and vertical stripes on opposite sides. The away kit consists of a white jersey with dark blue letters and numbers that have orange outlines. Players wear white socks, navy blue helmets with an Eagle head, and navy blue pants to all games.

Season-by-season records

Fan Traditions 
Bernie Dance

Fans of the Warsaw Eagles club have adopted the Bernie Dance (a dance style from the 1993 comedy film Weekend at Bernies II which involves loosely wobbling arms and tilting one’s head back) to celebrate each touchdown scored by their players during the game.

Eagles’ Nest (Orle Gniazdo)

An official fanclub organization called “Eagles’ Nest” composed of the team’s most devoted fans.

Stadiums 
Warsaw Eagles game site locations and stadiums:

 pre-2010: Piaseczno, Żyrardów, Marymont
 2010-2012: Bemowo
 2013-2022 : Polonia Stadium
 2023- : Bemowo

Honours
 Polish Bowl
 Champions: 2006, 2008, 2018

Media
Video of Clarence Anderson’s (WR) 75-yard punt return from Eagles’ home game against Warsaw Spartans during the 2012/13 season has been prominently featured across all major Polish and American sports media programs including ESPN and ESPN2.

Current Staff
Front Office
Owner – Paul Kusmierz

General Manager - Osman Hózman-Mirza-Sulkiewicz
President of the Board - Marek Włodarczyk

Head Coaches

Matt Simion - Head Coach
Terrance Owens - Offensive Coordinator
Deante Battle - Defensive Coordinator
Łukasz Wojtkowski – Strength and Conditioning

See also
 Sports in Warsaw

References

External links
 Official website
 Facebook
 Twitter
 YouTube

American football teams in Poland
Eagles
American football teams established in 1999
1999 establishments in Poland